Zuidoostbeemster is a town in the west of the Netherlands in the former municipality of Beemster, North Holland. It is located about 1 km northwest of Purmerend. Since 2022 it has been part of the municipality of Purmerend.

In 2005, the statistical district "Zuidoostbeemster", covering the village and surrounding countryside, had a population of around 2050. By 2020 the village grew to 3,310 inhabitants.

References

Populated places in North Holland
Geography of Purmerend